Xavier Joseph Huber (1864–1944) was a noted Swiss-born cyclist who won 60 medals and trophies in that country.

Life
Huber, born in Switzerland in 1864, "won recognition in his country for bicycle riding and during his career he won 60 medals and trophies in various competitions."

He moved to the Spokane, Washington area before the great fire of August 4, 1889.

"For many years Mr. Huber was engineer in the Desert hotel and later he landscaped some of Spokane's finest homes."

Huber died at home on Friday, January 21, 1944. He was survived by his widow, the former Anna Bittrick, and a large family, at S. 521 Arthur Street, Spokane. The body was handled by Ball & Dodd Funeral Home.

References

1864 births
1944 deaths
Sportspeople from Spokane, Washington
American people of Swiss descent
Swiss male cyclists
American male cyclists
Cyclists from Washington (state)